James Richard Cheek (April 27, 1936 – May 16, 2011) was an American diplomat.

Life
Born in Decatur, Georgia, Cheek served as United States Ambassador to Sudan in 1989, succeeding G. Norman Anderson and later was the United States Ambassador to Argentina from 1993–1996. He lived in Little Rock, Arkansas.

Foreign service career
Cheek served as a career member of the Foreign Service beginning in 1962. Over the years he served in many notable positions with the State Department including chief of the political section from 1971–1974, congressional fellow for the United States Senate and House of Representatives, 1974 – 1975; Deputy Director for Regional Affairs in the Bureau of Near East and South Asian Affairs, 1975 – 1977; and deputy chief of mission in Montevideo, 1977 – 1979. 
He has served as Deputy Assistant Secretary of State for Inter-American Affairs, 1979 – 1981.

Cheek was a foreign affairs fellow at Howard University and Fletcher School of Law and Diplomacy, 1981 – 1982; deputy chief of mission in Kathmandu, 1982 – 1985; and chief of mission and Chargé d'Affaires in Addis Ababa, 1985 – 1988.

From 1988 he was diplomat-in-residence at Howard University.

Notes

1936 births
2011 deaths
People from Little Rock, Arkansas
People from Decatur, Georgia
Ambassadors of the United States to Argentina
Ambassadors of the United States to Sudan
United States Foreign Service personnel
20th-century American diplomats